Ángela Cervantes (born 2 January 1993) is a Spanish actress.

Biography 
Born in Barcelona on 2 January 1993, she has an older brother, Álvaro, who also works as an actor. She played basketball when she was young and studied a degree in Criminology and Public Prevention Policies, although she dropped out to pursue an acting career. Having also been involved in stage plays since young, she made her television debut as an actress in Catalan series such as La riera and Com si fos ahir. She performed the recurring role of Ro in Perfect Life.

She had a breakthrough performance in her first film credits in Carol Rodríguez Colás' comedy-drama Girlfriends (2021), playing Soraya, a bar owner. She was subsequently cast in Paco Caballero's Donde caben dos and Laura Mañá's A Boyfriend for My Wife and also landed the role of Penélope in Pilar Palomero's drama La maternal.

Accolades

References 

Living people
1993 births
21st-century Spanish actresses
Spanish film actresses
Spanish television actresses
Actresses from Barcelona